Khurzarin (Dawn) is the main Ossetian language newspaper of South Ossetia. Founded on 1 January 1924, Khurzarin is published three times a week,  and has a circulation of 1,700 (down from 13,000 in 1975). 

The newspaper received the Order of the Badge of Honour in 1973.

Previous names
 1924-1932: Хурзӕрин, Dawn
 1932-1957: Коммунист, Communist
 1957-199?: Советон Ирыстон, Soviet Ossetia.

References

Newspapers established in 1924
Newspapers published in the Soviet Union
Ossetian-language newspapers